Chillerton Down is downland between the villages of Shorwell and Chillerton, on the Isle of Wight, England.

Description
There is a trig point within 2 metres of the summit. Part of Chillerton Down is a property of the National Trust. Chillerton Down transmitting station is nearby.

"Five Barrows" earthworks
Across a spur of the hill running north-east to south-west, there are earthworks, originally a rampart, thought to be an unfinished promontory fort of the Iron Age. The feature has been called the Five Barrows, because it has sunk in places, giving the appearance of separate mounds.

References

Hills of the Isle of Wight
Archaeological sites on the Isle of Wight
National Trust properties on the Isle of Wight